The BlackBerry Leap is a discontinued smartphone developed by BlackBerry Limited. Announced on March 3, 2015, at the Mobile World Congress with initial availability in April 2015, the Leap was a follow-on to the affordable Z3 model with a number of upgraded features. Upgrades included LTE support, higher-resolution display and cameras, higher-performance CPU and GPU, double the internal storage capacity, and the latest version of the BlackBerry 10 operating system. Size and weight increased very slightly from the Z3 model.

Specifications

Hardware 
The BlackBerry Leap has a 5.0-inch IPS LCD display, dual-core 1.5 GHz Krait Qualcomm Snapdragon S4 Plus processor, 2 GB of RAM and 16 GB of internal storage that can be expanded using microSD cards up to 256 GB. The phone has a 2800 mAh Li-Ion battery, 8 MP rear camera with LED flash and 2 MP front-facing camera with auto-focus. It is available in black or white colors. It features connectivity to WiFi, Bluetooth and GPS. It measures 144 mm x 72.8 mm x 9.5 mm and weighs 170 grams.

Design 

According to BlackBerry product designers, key design criteria for the Leap include solid single-body construction, edge-to-edge glass, straightforward SIM/SD card exchange and ease of repairability. Special attention is paid to aesthetic details such as the texture and grip of the covering, laser-cut speaker ports, and the overall look of the white-colored model.

Sales 
BlackBerry announced the global rollout of the Leap on April 15, 2015, with immediate availability via various resellers in the UK market. By April 22, 2015, customers in the French, German and US markets were able to order the Leap via either Amazon.com, BlackBerry Ltd's "Shop BlackBerry" website, or certain local resellers. Releases for other markets including Canada, India, United Arab Emirates and Saudi Arabia have since been made as well.

Reception 

Various journalists and industry pundits handled the device and gave preliminary assessments at its initial showing at the 2015 Mobile World Congress. It received reviews praising the sleek design as well as the display, although it was criticized for "not standing out."

Gallery

See also 
BlackBerry 10
List of BlackBerry 10 devices

References

External links 

 
 Shop BlackBerry

Leap
Discontinued smartphones